Abraham Akwasi Frimpong (born 6 April 1993) is a Ghanaian footballer who plays as a defender for Dinamo Batumi.

Club career
Born in Accra, he played in Italy with Vicenza Calcio youth team in the season 2010–11. In summer 2011 he was on trials at Serbian champions FK Partizan, however, after staying for a month in the club, in early August he left and joined another Serbian top-tier club, FK Vojvodina.  In Vojvodina he did not got a chance to debut in the league.

Napredak 
During the following winter break, in 2012, he moved to FK Napredak Kruševac, playing back then in the Serbian First League but with ambitions of returning to the SuperLiga. This would be achieved at the end of the 2012–13 season when Napredak finished top, and thus won promotion to the 2013–14 Serbian SuperLiga.

Red Star Belgrade 
After five years playing with Napredak, Frimpong signed with Red Star Belgrade on 13 January 2017. Frimpong scored first goal in his professional career in 3–1 victory over OFK Bačka on 13 August 2017.

Ferencváros 
On 16 June 2018, Frimpong moved to Hungarian side Ferencváros.

On 16 June 2020, he became champion with Ferencváros by beating Budapest Honvéd FC at the Hidegkuti Nándor Stadion on the 30th match day of the 2019–20 Nemzeti Bajnokság I season.

Al-Ain 
On 1 February 2021, Frimpong joined Saudi-Arabian side Al-Ain on a three-year deal.

Dinamo Batumi 
On 8 February 2022, Dinamo Batumi announced the signing of Frimpong.

Career statistics

Club

Honours
Napredak
Serbian First League: 2012–13, 2015–16

Red Star Belgrade
Serbian SuperLiga: 2017–18

Ferencváros
NB I: 2018–19, 2019–20, 2020–21

References

External links
 Frimpong Abraham stats at utakmica.rs
 
 

1993 births
Living people
Footballers from Accra
Ghanaian footballers
Ghanaian expatriate footballers
Association football defenders
FK Vojvodina players
FK Napredak Kruševac players
Red Star Belgrade footballers
Ferencvárosi TC footballers
Al-Ain FC (Saudi Arabia) players
Serbian First League players
Serbian SuperLiga players
Saudi Professional League players
Ghanaian expatriate sportspeople in Serbia
Ghanaian expatriate sportspeople in Hungary
Ghanaian expatriate sportspeople in Saudi Arabia
Expatriate footballers in Serbia
Expatriate footballers in Hungary
Expatriate footballers in Saudi Arabia